In mathematics, a dual system, dual pair, or duality over a field  is a triple  consisting of two vector spaces  and  over  and a non-degenerate bilinear map . 
Duality theory, the study of dual systems, is part of functional analysis.

According to Helmut H. Schaefer, "the study of a locally convex space in terms of its dual is the central part of the modern theory of topological vector spaces, for it provides the deepest and most beautiful results of the subject."

Definition, notation, and conventions

Pairings

For every  define

and for every  define

Let 

where each of these sets forms a vector space of linear functionals.

Dual pairings

  separates/distinguishes points of : if  is such that  then ; or equivalently, for all non-zero  the map  is not identically  (i.e. there exists a  such that );
  separates/distinguishes points of : if  is such that  then ; or equivalently, for all non-zero  the map  is not identically  (i.e. there exists an  such that ).

Total subsets

 implies  

Orthogonality

The definition of a subset being orthogonal to a vector is defined analogously.

The orthogonal complement or annihilator of a subset  is

Polar sets

Throughout,  will be a pairing over  

If  is a vector subspace of  then  and this is also equal to the real polar of

Dual definitions and results

Given a pairing  define a new pairing  where  for all 

There is a repeating theme in duality theory, which is that any definition for a pairing  has a corresponding dual definition for the pairing 

: Adhering to common practice, unless clarity is needed, whenever a definition (or result) for a pairing  is given then this article will omit mention of the corresponding dual definition (or result) but nevertheless use it.

For instance, if " distinguishes points of " (resp, " is a total subset of ") is defined as above, then this convention immediately produces the dual definition of " distinguishes points of " (resp, " is a total subset of ").

This following notation is almost ubiquitous and it allows us to avoid having to assign a symbol to 

Examples

Restriction of a pairing

If  is a duality then it's possible for a restrictions to fail to be a duality (e.g. if  and ).

This article will use the common practice of denoting the restriction  by

Canonical duality on a vector space

There is a canonical duality  where  which is called the evaluation map or the natural or canonical bilinear functional on  
Note in particular that for any   is just another way of denoting ; i.e. 

Clearly,  always distinguishes points of  so the canonical pairing is a dual system if and only if  separates points of  
The following notation is now nearly ubiquitous in duality theory.

Canonical duality on a topological vector space

Suppose  is a topological vector space (TVS) with continuous dual space  
Then the restriction of the canonical duality  to  ×  defines a pairing  for which  separates points of  

Assumption: As is commonly done, whenever  is a TVS then, unless indicated otherwise, it will be assumed without comment that it's associated with the canonical pairing 

Polars and duals of TVSs

The following result shows that the continuous linear functionals on a TVS are exactly those linear functionals that are bounded on a neighborhood of the origin.

Inner product spaces and complex conjugate spaces

If  is a  Hilbert space then  forms a dual system.
If  is a complex Hilbert space then  forms a dual system if and only if  If  is non-trivial then  does not even form pairing since the inner product is sesquilinear rather than bilinear.

Suppose that  is a complex pre-Hilbert space with scalar multiplication denoted as usual by juxtaposition or by a dot  
Define the map

where the right hand side uses the scalar multiplication of  

Other examples

Suppose   and for all  let  Then  is a pairing such that  distinguishes points of  but  does not distinguish points of  Furthermore, 
Let    (where  is such that ), and  Then  is a dual system.

Weak topology

Suppose that  is a pairing of vector spaces over  
The notation   or (if no confusion could arise) simply  is used to denote  endowed with the weak topology  

: If "" is attached to a topological definition (e.g. -converges, -bounded,  etc.) then it means that definition when the first space (i.e. ) carries the  topology. So for instance, if a sequence  in  "-converges" or "weakly converges" then this means that it converges in  whereas if it were a sequence in  then this would mean that it converges in ).

A net  -converges to  if and only if for all   converges to  
If  is a sequence of orthonormal vectors in Hilbert space, then  converges weakly to 0 but does not norm-converge to 0 (or any other vector).

Bounded subsets

 where 

Hausdorffness

If  is a pairing then the following are equivalent:
  is Hausdorff.

Weak representation theorem

The following theorem is of fundamental importance to duality theory because it completely characterizes the continuous dual space of 

This is commonly written as

Moreover, if  is endowed with a topology that is finer than  then the continuous dual space of  will necessarily contain  as a subset. 
So for instance, when  is endowed with the strong dual topology (and so is denoted by ) then

Orthogonals, quotients, and subspaces

If  is a pairing then for any subset  of :

 and this set is -closed;
;
 Thus if  is a -closed vector subspace of  then 
If  is a family of -closed vector subspaces of  then 
If  is a family of subsets of  then 

Subspaces

Also,  is a paired space (where  means ) where  is defined by

The topology  is equal to the subspace topology that  inherits from  
Furthermore, if  is a dual system then so is 

Quotients

Suppose that  is a vector subspace of  
Then is a paired space where  is defined by

Polars and the weak topology

If  is a locally convex space and if  is a subset of the continuous dual space  then  is -bounded if and only if  for some barrel  in 

The following results are important for defining polar topologies.

If  is a pairing and  then:
 The bipolar theorem in particular "is an indispensable tool in working with dualities."
 is -bounded if and only if  is absorbing in 
If in addition  distinguishes points of  then  is -bounded if and only if it is -totally bounded.

Transposes

Transpose of a linear map with respect to pairings

For all  let  be the map defined by  
It is said that s transpose or adjoint is well-defined if the following conditions are satisfied:

In this case, for any  there exists (by condition 2) a unique (by condition 1)  such that ), where this element of  will be denoted by  
This defines a linear map 

 
that is,
  for all 

By the conventions mentioned at the beginning of this article, this also defines the transpose of linear maps of the form  
 
 
 
etc. (see footnote for details).

Properties of the transpose

 Let  and let  denotes the absolute polar of  then:
 ;
 if  for some  then ;
 if  is such that  then ;
 
 These results hold when the real polar is used in place of the absolute polar.

Weak continuity

The following result shows that the existence of the transpose map is intimately tied to the weak topology.

Weak topology and the canonical duality

Suppose that  is a vector space and that  is its the algebraic dual. 

Weak completeness

If  is a complete topological vector space say that  is -complete or (if no ambiguity can arise) weakly-complete. 
There exist Banach spaces that are not weakly-complete (despite being complete in their norm topology).

If  is a vector space then under the canonical duality,  is complete. 

In particular, with respect to the canonical duality, if  is a vector subspace of  such that  separates points of  then  is complete if and only if  

Identification of Y with a subspace of the algebraic dual

: Often, whenever  is injective (especially when  forms a dual pair) then it is common practice to assume without loss of generality that  is a vector subspace of the algebraic dual space of  that  is the natural evaluation map, and also denote  by 

Algebraic adjoint

In the special case where the dualities are the canonical dualities  and  the transpose of a linear map  is always well-defined. 
that is,  
In this case, for all  
 
or equivalently, 

Examples

Weak continuity and openness

Then  is weakly continuous if and only if it satisfies any of the following equivalent conditions: 
  is continuous;
 
If  is weakly continuous then  will be continuous and furthermore, 

A map  between topological spaces is relatively open if  is an open mapping, where  is the range of 

Then the following are equivalent:
  is relatively open;
 
Furthermore, 
  is injective (resp. bijective) if and only if  is surjective (resp. bijective);
  is surjective if and only if  is relatively open and injective.

Transpose of a map between TVSs

The transpose of map between two TVSs is defined if and only if  is weakly continuous.

If  is a linear map between two Hausdorff locally convex topological vector spaces then:
 If  is weakly continuous then it is both Mackey continuous and strongly continuous (defined below).

Metrizability and separability

Let  be a locally convex space with continuous dual space  and let   
 If  is separable and metrizable, then  is separable.
 If  is a normed space whose continuous dual space is separable (when given the usual norm topology), then  is separable.

Polar topologies and topologies compatible with pairing

Starting with only the weak topology, the use of polar sets produces a range of locally convex topologies. 
Such topologies are called polar topologies. 
The weak topology is the weakest topology of this range.

Polar topologies

forms a subbasis of neighborhoods at the origin. 
When  is endowed with this -topology then it is denoted by Y. 
Every polar topology is necessarily locally convex. 
When  is a directed set with respect to subset inclusion (i.e. if for all  there exists some  such that ) then this neighborhood subbasis at 0 actually forms a neighborhood basis at 0.

The following table lists some of the more important polar topologies.

Definitions involving polar topologies

Continuity

Bounded subsets

Topologies compatible with a pair

If  distinguishes points of  then by identifying  as a vector subspace of 's algebraic dual, the defining condition becomes:  

The weak topology  is compatible with the pairing  (as was shown in the Weak representation theorem) and it is in fact the weakest such topology. 
There is a strongest topology compatible with this pairing and that is the Mackey topology. 
If  is a normed space that is not reflexive then the usual norm topology on its continuous dual space is  compatible with the duality

Mackey–Arens theorem

The following is one of the most important theorems in duality theory.

A locally convex space whose given topology is identical to the Mackey topology is called a Mackey space. 
The following consequence of the above Mackey-Arens theorem is also called the Mackey-Arens theorem.

Mackey's theorem, barrels, and closed convex sets

The above theorem implies that the closed and convex subsets of a locally convex space depend  on the continuous dual space. 
Consequently, the closed and convex subsets are the same in any topology compatible with duality; 
In particular, if  is a subset of  then  is a barrel in  if and only if it is a barrel in 

The following theorem shows that barrels (i.e. closed absorbing disks) are exactly the polars of weakly bounded subsets.

If  is a topological vector space then: 
 If  is Hausdorff and locally convex then every barrel in  absorbs every convex bounded complete subset of 

All of this leads to Mackey's theorem, which is one of the central theorems in the theory of dual systems. 
In short, it states the bounded subsets are the same for any two Hausdorff locally convex topologies that are compatible with the same duality.

Examples

Space of finite sequences

Let  denote the space of all sequences of scalars  such that  for all sufficiently large  
Let  and define a bilinear map  by 
 
Then  
Moreover, a subset  is -bounded (resp. -bounded) if and only if there exists a sequence  of positive real numbers such that  for all  and all indices  (resp. and ). 
It follows that there are weakly bounded (that is, -bounded) subsets of  that are not strongly bounded (that is, not -bounded).

See also

Notes

References

Bibliography

  
 Michael Reed and Barry Simon, Methods of Modern Mathematical Physics, Vol. 1, Functional Analysis, Section III.3. Academic Press, San Diego, 1980. .

External links

 Duality Theory

Functional analysis
Pair
Linear functionals
Topological vector spaces